Cockleshell may refer to:

 The shell of a cockle, an edible, marine bivalve mollusc
 Cockleshell Bay, a stop-motion children's television series
 The Cockleshell Heroes, a 1955 British Technicolor war film
 Lentinellus cochleatus (also aniseed cockleshell), a wood-inhabiting fungus